Lucas Wolfe (born October 22, 1986) is an American race car driver. He currently races in the central Pennsylvania area in his own 5w.

Early life and education
Wolfe was born in Mechanicsburg, Pennsylvania. He began Quarter Midget racing in 1992 as a five-year-old. In both 1993 and 1994, Wolfe was the Norlebco Quarter Midget champion. From 1993 to 2000, Wolfe had 338 race starts—90 of which he won.

Professional career

2001–2002
In 2001, at fourteen years old, Wolfe began racing 600cc micro sprint cars at Linda’s Speedway in Pennsylvania. He won six feature races and became the 2001 Linda’s Speedway Rookie of the Year. Wolfe won eight feature races in 2002 and became the Trail-Way Speedway Track Champion. He was also the 2002 runner-up in the Linda’s Speedway Points Championship.

2003–2007
In 2003, sixteen-year-old Wolfe began racing 900 horsepower winged sprint cars. Although his limited budget kept him racing close to hometown, Wolfe often raced several nights a week. He was a 2003 finalist for the National Sprint Car Poll Rookie of the Year as well as a runner-up for the Williams Grove Speedway Rookie of the Year.

On July 9, 2004, at Williams Grove Speedway, Wolfe won his first sprint car race. Wolfe was the youngest race winner in the 65-year history of Williams Grove Speedway. He won again at Williams Grove Speedway (the Jack Gunn Memorial race) on September 5, 2004, and at the Clinton County Speedway on October 10, 2004. Wolfe was selected as one of “ten promising young American racers” in the Red Bull Driver Search.

On June 29, 2005, Wolfe set a track record for a single lap at the Silver Spring Speedway. From 2005 to 2007, he won 14 feature events and several championships. Wolfe started racing part-time in the WoO Series in 2007 and earned three awards for fastest qualifying time.

2008–2012

World of Outlaws

In 2008, Wolfe began racing full-time in the World of Outlaws. On June 9, 2008, Wolfe crashed while running a preliminary heat at Tri-County Speedway in Illinois. He suffered cracked vertebrae in his upper back, an injury that would force Wolfe to sit out much of the 2008 season. Wolfe, however, had a late season comeback. He finished 2008 with 9 top 5 finishes—and  the honor of 2008 WoO Rookie of the Year.

In every season from 2009 to 2012, Wolfe finished as one of the top ten WoO drivers. His place finishes in the points championship are as follows: 10th in 2009, 8th in 2010, 7th in 2011, and 9th in 2012. During his sprint car career, Wolfe’s accomplishments include 22 race wins,  22 fastest qualifying time awards, 10 awards for passing the most cars during a race, and 5 track records.

Despite some mechanical struggles in the early part of the summer of 2012, Wolfe won his first World of Outlaws feature event on August 3, 2012, at Bloomington Speedway. Wolfe led the race for the final 22 laps.

2013
On February 13, 2013, Wolfe was announced as the driver of the Buffalo Wild Wings #82 fielded by Blazing Racing. Wolfe split from the team on June 12, 2013.

2014-2016
Wolfe was announced as the driver of the John and Pee Wee Zemaitis "Zemco #1" for the 2014 season. The team had multiple wins and was the 2014 Pa Speedweek Champion.

Other sprint car racing 

Outside of the WoO, Wolfe has raced sprint cars internationally in Australia and New Zealand. In addition to the 410 cid sprint cars Wolfe typically raced, he occasionally raced in 360 cid sprint cars.

Personal life 

Wolfe reside in Mechanicsburg Pa. He is the son of former sprint car driver Randy Wolfe.

Racing record

Recent career summary 

† partial season due to injury

References

External links
 Official website
 Drive profile for World of Outlaws

World of Outlaws drivers
Living people
People from Mechanicsburg, Pennsylvania
1986 births